Train Sim World (abbreviated to TSW) is a train simulation game series developed by Dovetail Games. It was released on 24 July 2018. For the first time, Train Sim World allows players to walk around the game world in a first-person mode. This mode is utilised in tutorials, scenarios and services where the first-person mode is required to complete tasks such as refuelling, navigation a building or changing switches.

Releases

Train Sim World: CSX Heavy Haul
During beta release, the game was originally called Train Sim World: CSX Heavy Haul, which consisted of one playable route, Sand Patch Grade, based in the United States.

Train Sim World: Founders Edition
The second version was Founders Edition, which was available on Xbox One, containing Great Western Express.

Train Sim World
The third version, simply Train Sim World, was available on Microsoft Windows, Xbox One and PlayStation 4, featuring three routes: Great Western Express: London Paddington–Reading, Rapid Transit: Dessau Hbf–Markkleeberg-Gaschwitz, and Northeast Corridor: New Rochelle–Newark Liberty International Airport, as well as Sand Patch Grade for the Windows version only.

Train Sim World 2020

The fourth version, Train Sim World 2020, is available for Microsoft Windows, Xbox One, and PlayStation 4, featuring four routes: Great Western Express, Long Island Rail Road (Penn Station to Hicksville, Hempstead Branch, Atlantic Terminal, Belmont), Main-Spessart Bahn (Aschaffenburg Hbf to Gemünden (Main)), and Northern Trans-Pennine (Manchester Victoria to Leeds route add-on), as well as Sand Patch Grade for Windows only. The 2020 edition featured a Digital Deluxe edition containing a bonus route containing Caltrain's Peninsula Corridor (San Francisco 4th and King Street to San Jose Diridon route add-on).

On 12 December 2019, Dovetail Games released the East Coastway add-on. In addition to the Brighton to Eastbourne route, there is a branch route between Lewes and Seaford. The release includes the Class 377/4 and the Class 66. Further add-on routes included Rhein-Ruhr Osten (Wuppertal Hbf to Hagen Hbf), Ruhr-Sieg Nord (Hagen Hbf to Finnentrop), Haupstrecke Rhein-Ruhr (Bochum Hbf to Duisburg Hbf), Tees Valley Line (Darlington to Saltburn), West Somerset Railway (Minehead to Bishops Lydeard), and Canadian National Oakville Subdivision. Several individual locomotives were also released as DLC, including the British Rail Class 20 "Chopper" and the former East German BR 143 and BR 155.

Train Sim World 2 
The fifth version, Train Sim World 2, was announced on 9 June 2020, with an original planned release date of 6 August 2020. The announcement promoted new features, including the Livery Editor and Scenario Designer. There were two new routes and multiple trains planned for its release: the ICE 3M and Talent 2 running from Köln Hbf to Aachen Hbf, branded as Schnellfahrstrecke Köln-Aachen, and the London Underground 1972 Stock, with the Bakerloo line. The game also comes with Sand Patch Grade route (Cumberland–Rockwood), featuring the following locomotives: AC4400CW, GP38-2, SD40-2. While the route is not new, it has been updated for Windows and now also available on consoles PlayStation 4 and Xbox One with major optimization to the consoles. The Deluxe Edition also includes East Coastway as a Preserved Collection route.

The Preserved Collection allows players to import their previously owned Train Sim World and Train Sim World 2020 bundled routes and DLC into the new game. This means players can continue using them without the need to pay for them again. Dovetail Games announced the game would be delayed on 16 July, with a rescheduled release date of 20 August, from the original 6 August.  This was to allow them to make "Preserved Collection" add-ons compatible with their new Scenario Designer. They confirmed that content from this category will not be compatible with their new Livery Designer, due to a change in the way they develop trains, although such compatibility might be provided in a future upgrade (this has since been confirmed; Livery Designer compatibility for East Coastway was included in a February 2021 patch, with more routes to follow). They also announced within one of their Community Q&A livestreams that their Northeast Corridor route add-on, as well as their Amtrak SW1000R and CSX GP40-2 loco addons were not going to be part of the "Preserved Collection" due to technical issues.

Dovetail Games unveiled their first roadmap on 18 August, which presented their plans for future additions to the game, as well as the timeline for the additional "Preserved Collection" addons.

Train Sim World 2 was released to the public on 20 August. More DLC followed: Haupstrecke München-Augsburg: München Hbf–Augsburg Hbf, LGV Méditerranée: Marseille–Avignon, Southeastern High Speed: St Pancras–Faversham, Clinchfield Railroad: Elkhorn–Dante, Lübeck–Hamburg railway: Hamburg–Lübeck and Scottish City Commuter together with Isle of Wight: Ryde Pier Head–Shanklin and Arosalinie: Chur–Arosa from third-party developer Rivet Games, and Union Pacific Cane Creek: Thompson–Potash from third-party developer Skyhook Games.

The game also includes locomotive DLC from all versions including: BR 182, MP36PH-3C, C40-8W, Class 465, BR 101, MP15DC, M3, and Diesel Legends of the Great Western (Class 52, 101, and 08).

On May 4, 2021, Dovetail Games announced a Season Ticket called Rush Hour, which included 3 new routes: the Boston Sprinter (Boston–Providence); London Commuter (Brighton–Victoria); and Nahverkehr Dresden (Dresden–Riesa). The routes were released between August and October 2021.

On 19 July 2022 Rivet Games and Dovetail Games released BR Class 484: Isle of Wight 2022. A train and route DLC featuring the Isle of Wight and the BR Class 484, going from Ryde Pier Head to Shanklin.

Train Sim World 2: Rush Hour 
Train Sim World 2: Rush Hour is a season pass containing three routes and comes with a free update to the passenger system within Train Sim World 2.

Boston Sprinter released on 19 August 2021. It stretches 47 miles (77 kilometers) between Boston and Providence; includes the Amtrak ACS-64 and the MBTA (Massachusetts Bay Transport Authority) F40PH-3C. The CTC-3 Coaches and Cab Car are also included. The CSX GP38-2 from Sand Patch Grade is also layered onto Boston Sprinter, however there are no extra services.

Nahverkehr Dresden released on 9 September 2021. It spans the 55-kilometre line between Riesa and Dresden, and also included the 23-kilometre fast line which runs parallel to the main route. The 5-kilometre branch to Großenhain and 9-kilometre branch to Meißen Triebischtal are also included. The route includes the DB BR 442 'Talent 2', DB BR 143, DB BR 146.2, MRCE BR 185 and DB BR 363 as the primary trains, along with the fourth generation Doppelstockwagen coaches and cab car. The DB BR 101 DLC and DB BR 406 are layered on and includes intercity and ICE services that use the fast line. 

London Commuter released on 7 October 2021. It represents the 50-mile Brighton Mainline between London Victoria and Brighton, along with the 7-mile Quarry Branch and 1 mile of the North Downs Line (with Reigate being the end). The route includes the Class 377 and Class 387. The Class 375 and Class 465 layer on from the Southeastern Highspeed DLC, providing Southeastern AI services out of London Victoria and diverted services between East Croydon and Redhill (Class 375). The Class 166 and Class 43 are also layered on from Great Western Express, including Great Western Railway services to Redhill and Gatwick Airport from Reigate (Class 166). The Class 43 runs diverted AI only services past Clapham Junction.

On 11 November 2021, the Rush Hour Season Ticket was taken off sale on all stores. However the three routes can still be bought separately, or as a bundle in the Rush Hour Deluxe Edition of Train Sim World 2. The Deluxe Edition includes the base routes, Sand Patch Grade, Schnellfahrstrecke Köln-Aachen, Bakerloo Line, as well as the three Rush Hour routes.

Train Sim World 3 
The sixth and the current version, Train Sim World 3, was announced on 9 August 2022, with its official release date on 6 September 2022, although it released to pre-orders on 2 September 2022. It features 3 routes: Schnellfahrstrecke: Kassel - Würzburg, an extended version of Southeastern High Speed which now includes Ashford International and Dartford, and Cajon Pass. New weather features such as Dynamic Weather and volumetric clouds are also to be added in; passengers will also now change clothes based on the weather and season including the use of umbrellas. Like TSW2, preserved collection will be brought back and all routes currently playable in TSW2 will be playable with-in TSW3, renamed "Train Sim World Compatible" add-ons. 

More DLC followed in 2022 such as Birmingham Cross-City, Bahnstrecke Bremen - Oldenburg, and a fictional Christmas themed route called "The Holiday Express - Runaway Elf".

Other DLC for 2023 currently in development for Train Sim World 3 includes Acela Express as a loco DLC for Boston Sprinter with Northeast Corridor from New York to Trenton including the NJ Transit ALP-46 and Amtrak ACS-64 including the return of the Metroliner Cab Car as part of another US route. Another German route from Koblenz to Mainz featuring the DB Class 103 and DB Class 110 is also halfway through development with the next UK route being another steam route called Peak Forest. 

Third party content such as a steam railtour for West Cornwall Local and ScotRail Express: Edinburgh - Glasgow (developed by Rivet Games), Niddertalbahn: Bad Vilbel–Glauburg-Stockheim (Developed by TrainSimGermany) and the Midland Mainline section from Leicester to Derby & Nottingham (developed by Skyhook Games) are all confirmed as third party content.

TSW3 will have 2 versions within the base game with an updated version of Spirit of Steam: Liverpool Lime Street - Crewe
under the Deluxe Edition.

Editing tools
Train Sim World 2 features a livery editor and a scenario editor, with further plans on adding features to the current toolset. While previously stating that trains in the Preserved Collection would not be compatible with the livery editor, Dovetail Games announced on their 10 November 2020 roadmap that compatibility was in production.

Unreal Engine 4 editing tools
Originally, there were plans to bring Unreal Engine 4-based editing tools to Train Sim World. In a September 2018 studio update, it was revealed that the tools would be the same as that used by Dovetail Games to create content, allowing users to create routes, locomotives, wagons, coaches, scenarios and services. However, it would not have been possible to edit existing routes released by Dovetail Games at launch. It was planned for an open beta of the editing tools to be released. Dovetail Games also planned on creating a series of video tutorials for the editing tools.

However, during a Train Sim World 2 Q&A livestream held on 11 June 2020, the developers announced that tools related to Unreal Engine 4 would not be released to the general public. Community managers further confirmed this on Dovetail Games' forums, arguing that "additional considerations make a public release impossible". The tools are available to third-party developers, though.

Reception

The PlayStation 4 and Xbox One versions of Train Sim World were released to "mixed or average" reviews, according to the review aggregator Metacritic.

References

External links
 

PlayStation 4 games
PlayStation 5 games
2018 video games
Video games developed in the United Kingdom
Video games set in the United States
Windows games
Xbox Cloud Gaming games
Xbox One games
Xbox Series X and Series S games
Train simulation video games
Video games set in the United Kingdom
Video games set in Germany
Video games set in Switzerland
Unreal Engine games
Video games set in Maryland